St Mary Magdalene Church is one of Hope Church Islington's places of worship, an Anglican church on Holloway Road in north London dedicated to Jesus' companion Mary Magdalene. It is located in St Mary Magdalene Gardens opposite Islington Central Library. St Mary Magdalene is part of the Parish of Hope Church Islington (previously the Parish of St Mary Magdalene and St David). In 2013 its sister church St David's on Westbourne road was reopened so St Mary Magdalene now functions as one of two worship sites of the Parish, with a single leadership and a staff team. The early 19th century building accommodates the activities of the church congregation, including church services, a winter night shelter, 'Mini Mags' – a toddlers group, and provides spaces to other users. Baptisms and confirmations, marriages and funerals are regularly held here. The building and its iron railings are both Grade II* listed structures, having first been listed in 1954.

Congregation
The church has traditionally belonged in the evangelical stream of the Church of England. More recently it has become more closely associated with a charismatic evangelical approach to worship, informal other than at the 9am service which is robed. There are good ties with other churches in the Deanery, especially St Mark's Tollington and Christ Church Highbury. There is also a strong relationship with Holy Trinity Brompton and related churches. St Mary Magdalene is a certified Fairtrade church. Since November 2013 the congregation of Hope Church Islington has expanded into three sites - St Mary Magdalene on Holloway Road and  St David's on Westbourne Road (meeting for 4 services every Sunday) and the Nags Head Church Community (meeting at Costa Coffee at the Nags Head on Wednesday evenings at 7). There is also a Tuesday morning service at 09:45 in termite for toddlers with their parents and carers, at St Mary Magdalene.

History
Building & Gardens: The church was built in 1814 to a design by William Wickings as a chapel of ease to the parish church of St. Mary's farther south on Upper Street. It became a parish church in its own right in 1894. A typical Georgian six-bay brick box with three tiers of small windows, the lowest to the crypt. The bell tower at the south of the building is square and houses eight bells, cast by John Warner and Son at their Spitalfields foundry in 1875. The bells are a “maiden” ring (they have never been re-tuned or altered in any way). Inside, the interior retains its galleries on three sides supported by Tuscan columns. Originally horse shoe-shaped these were converted to a rectangular plan when the furnishings were altered in 1894–5. Most of this work was undone in 1983, when the choir stalls and pews were removed and meeting rooms were built under the galleries. The church gardens are the church's old burial ground, which was opened to the public at the end of the 19th century, and now is a space appreciated by many for its recreational amenity.

Music
Music is led by vocalists and a band at the 11am service and is contemporary. 
The 9am service's music is led from the piano and features well-known hymns.
There are occasional lunch-time or evening concerts, advertised on the church's website.
St. Mary Magdalene is home to a fine three-manual organ by George Pike England, slightly modified by the famous London firms of Henry Willis & Sons and N. P. Mander. Henry Willis himself was organist here for nearly thirty years. The organ is not in use (2009) as only about a third of its pipes are working.

Sunday services
Hope Church at St Mary Magdalene conducts two church services every Sunday: a 9am service of Holy Communion and a more contemporary informal service at 11am. Hope Church at St David has a 10:30 am service with children's groups and a 5pm service with extended worship.  In addition, the parish runs regular prayer meetings, bible study and discussion groups, and two Alpha courses three times a year (next one starting 26 January at 7pm at St Mary Magdalene).

Additional activities
The church's activities and ministries include:
 A Little Hope – a Parenting support group, Term time on Mondays 10–11:30
 Bellringers – regularly ring the church bells (practices on Wednesdays at 7–9pm; ringing at 10–11am Sundays)

In addition, St Mary Magdalene is closely associated with the St Mary Magdalene Academy on Liverpool Road.

Hope Church Islington is in the Deanery of Islington, in the Diocese of London (Stepney Episcopal Area).

See also
HTB network

References

External links
 Parish website
 St Mary Magdalene Academy website

Churches completed in 1814
19th-century Church of England church buildings
Church of England church buildings in the London Borough of Islington
Diocese of London
Holy Trinity Brompton plants